Peter Barinka (born April 6, 1977) is a Slovak former professional ice hockey player.

He played in the Czech Extraliga for HC Zlín, HC Oceláři Třinec and BK Mladá Boleslav. He also played in the Slovak Extraliga for HK Dukla Trenčín, HK Spišská Nová Ves, HKm Zvolen, MsHK Žilina and HK Nitra.

External links

1977 births
Living people
BK Mladá Boleslav players
HC Oceláři Třinec players
PSG Berani Zlín players
HC Nové Zámky players
HK Dukla Trenčín players
HK Nitra players
HK Spišská Nová Ves players
HKM Zvolen players
MsHK Žilina players
ŠHK 37 Piešťany players
Slovak ice hockey forwards
Sportspeople from Trenčín
TH Unia Oświęcim players
Slovak expatriate ice hockey players in the Czech Republic
Slovak expatriate sportspeople in Poland
Expatriate ice hockey players in Poland
Expatriate ice hockey players in Romania
Slovak expatriate sportspeople in Romania